Dirk Schreyer (born 28 July 1944) is a competition rower and Olympic champion for West Germany.

Schreyer won a gold medal in the eight at the 1968 Summer Olympics in Mexico City, as a member of the rowing team from West Germany.

References

External links
 

1944 births
Olympic rowers of West Germany
Rowers at the 1968 Summer Olympics
Olympic gold medalists for West Germany
Living people
Olympic medalists in rowing
West German male rowers
World Rowing Championships medalists for West Germany
Medalists at the 1968 Summer Olympics
European Rowing Championships medalists